Warm Sounds was an English musical duo, consisting of Denver Gerrard and Barry Younghusband, and later adding John Carr. They are considered a one hit wonder for their hit single, "Birds and Bees", from 1967. However they had an "airplay hit" follow up with "Sticks and Stones" in August 1967. This track did not make it into the BBC chart, but was climbing the Radio London Fab 40 when the station closed on 15 August, and had risen to number 9 in the final chart. The group existed from 1967 to 1968 before disbanding.

Toward the end of their career, the duo mixed heavily overdubbed and experimental psychedelic tapes. Carr and Husband later joined the band, Hapshash and the Coloured Coat.

Charts

References

English pop music duos